The Lone Wolf's Daughter is a lost 1929 feature silent film with talking sequences, music and sound effects. It was directed by Albert S. Rogell and stars Bert Lytell. It was produced and distributed by Columbia Pictures.

The story was previously filmed as the silent film The Lone Wolf's Daughter in 1919.

Cast
Bert Lytell as Michael Lanyard / The Lone Wolf
Gertrude Olmstead as Helen Fairchild
Charles K. Gerrard as Count Polinac
Lilyan Tashman as Velma
Donald Keith as Bobby Crenshaw
Florence Allen as Adrienne
Robert Elliott as Ethier
Ruth Cherrington as Mrs. Crenshaw

References

External links

1929 films
Columbia Pictures films
Lost American films
Films directed by Albert S. Rogell
American black-and-white films
1929 mystery films
Remakes of American films
Transitional sound films
The Lone Wolf films
1929 lost films